Shawnacy Campbell "Shawn" Barber (born 27 May 1994) is a Canadian track and field athlete specialising in the pole vault. He is the former world champion in pole vault having won the event with a height of 5.90 m at the 2015 World Championships in Athletics in Beijing. Barber also became a Pan American Games champion in winning the 2015 edition of the Games with a height of 5.80 m. Barber won a bronze medal at the 2014 Commonwealth Games in Glasgow as well.

His outdoor personal best jump of 5.93 metres was made on July 25, 2015, it is the current national record. His indoor personal best is 6.00 metres from 2016 (Canadian Indoor Record). Barber is tied for the Pan Am record together with Lázaro Borges. He also holds the NCAA Collegiate Indoor Record at 5.91m.

Career

College
After competing at the 2013 World Championships Barber failed to qualify for the final. At the 2014 Commonwealth Games in Glasgow where he met with success winning bronze as a 20-year-old in the event clearing 5.45 m on the first attempt but failing at 5.55.

During the 2015 season Barber set a personal best and national record of 5.91 m at the 2015 Texas Relays to set an NCAA Collegiate Record. With the first event of the season he set a world leading number. After the Texas Relays event he said "You know, six months ago if you asked me if I'd be jumping at 5.90 consistently, I would have told you 'No way.' But it's funny how things happen, and I couldn't be more grateful to be where I am right now.". Barber was 2015 USTFCCCA Great Lakes Regional Field Athlete of the Year. At the 2015 NCAA finals in June Barber won the event with a jump of 5.60 metres. With this title Barber became the only three-time NCAA champion for Akron after winning the 2014 and 2015 NCAA indoor titles as well.

Pan Am and World success
The 2015 Pan American Games took place on Canadian soil in Toronto, Ontario. Barber jumped to a 5.80 there, tying a Pan Am record with Lázaro Borges who set the record in 2011. He had missed his 5.40 jump very badly in the early rounds, bringing on some nerves to both himself and the home crowd. He later explained the slip up as a result of earlier applying sunscreen with some residue remaining on his hands. Barber signed with Nike in August 2015.

Following the Pan American games in Toronto Barber next competed in the 2015 World Championships in Athletics taking place in Beijing. There he staked his name as a rising star cementing his status by winning the world title with a jump of 5.90 m. This was Canada's first world title in athletics since 2003, though Derek Drouin would match Barber's gold later on in the high jump in Beijing. After the win Barber said "I don't think it has sunk in quite yet, and I'm looking forward to the next few days when it does. I was fortunate to be very consistent throughout the meet. That was the name of the game. I came in knowing that it was going to be a meet that came down to first attempts. I couldn't have asked for a better competition."

He cleared six metres for the first time in January 2016 at the Pole Vault Summit, improving his own national record and becoming the first under-23 athlete to ever reach that height. Barber took this momentum into the 2016 IAAF World Indoor Championships. There had been a growing rivalry with himself and Renaud Lavillenie since the outdoor world championships, though here in the indoor event Barber did not meet those expectations. He finished fourth while Lavillenie would go on to win the event. Barber was disappointed after, saying that "The nerves were definitely there. Anytime you get together with this group of guys and you start jumping at these heights, it's definitely a nervous event. Coming through on those third attempts definitely helped, and it taught me a lot about my jumping style, and gives me a good platform to go on outdoors."

At the 2016 Summer Olympics in Rio de Janeiro, Barber placed tenth in wet and windy conditions.  He cleared 5.50 metres before missing on all three attempts at 5.65.

After the Games, Canada's Sport Dispute Resolution Centre announced that Barber had tested positive for cocaine prior to the Games, but was permitted to compete as the use was found to be inadvertent. According to the NY Times Barber avoided a multiyear suspension in 2016, successfully attributing a low-level cocaine violation to an intimate encounter with a woman he had met on Craigslist the night before Olympic trials.

Personal
Barber holds dual Canadian-American citizenship, having been born in New Mexico and his father George Barber grew up in El Paso, Texas, but was himself born in Kincardine, Ontario. At age 10 his mother Ann Barber divorced his father and he moved to New Caney, Texas. He split his time growing up between the Toronto area and the United States and graduated from Kingwood Park High School in Houston. Barber refers to Toronto as his hometown during competitions and says he chose to represent Canada since his particular sport was more important in Canada as well as to follow in his father's footsteps who was a pole vaulter for Canada at the 1983 World Championships and a competitor twice at Team Canada Summer Olympic trials. Barber came out as gay in April 2017.

Competition record

1Representing the Americas

References

External links

 
  (archive)
 
 
 
 

1994 births
Living people
Canadian people of Scottish descent
Sportspeople from Las Cruces, New Mexico
Canadian male pole vaulters
Pan American Games track and field athletes for Canada
Pan American Games gold medalists for Canada
Pan American Games medalists in athletics (track and field)
Athletes (track and field) at the 2015 Pan American Games
Athletes (track and field) at the 2014 Commonwealth Games
World Athletics Championships athletes for Canada
World Athletics Championships medalists
Commonwealth Games bronze medallists for Canada
Athletes (track and field) at the 2016 Summer Olympics
Olympic track and field athletes of Canada
Commonwealth Games medallists in athletics
LGBT track and field athletes
Canadian LGBT sportspeople
Gay sportsmen
Athletes (track and field) at the 2018 Commonwealth Games
Canadian Track and Field Championships winners
World Athletics Championships winners
Medalists at the 2015 Pan American Games
Medallists at the 2014 Commonwealth Games
Medallists at the 2018 Commonwealth Games
Canadian gay men